Vriesea roberto-seidelii is a plant species in the genus Vriesea. This species is endemic to Brazil.

References

roberto-seidelii
Flora of Brazil